Morchella galilaea is a species of fungus in the family Morchellaceae that was described as new to science in 2012. Unlike most morels, which are characterized by spring season fruiting, M. galilaea fruits in autumn (between October and December). Molecular studies have shown that the fungus is found in China, Java, Hawaii, Israel, New Zealand, India, Turkey, and three countries in Africa. The type collection was made under Fraxinus syriaca plants in Israel.

References

External links

galilaea
Edible fungi
Fungi described in 2012
Fungi of Africa
Fungi of Asia
Fungi of New Zealand